Aliza Mizrahi  is an Israeli film written, produced and directed by Menahem Golan.

History
Aliza Mizrahi premiered on March 23, 1967 at the Israeli Film festival in Ashkelon starring Edna Fliedel. The premiere was attended by Israel's tourism minister and the mayor of Ashkelon. Aliza Mizrahi was the opening film of the festival.

Plot
The firm of Green, Greenberg and Greenbaum is in trouble: large quantities of jam are missing from the storage. Worse, two of the senior partners are murdered. The incompetent inspector Klein (Avner Hizkiyahu) is trying to solve the case, without much success, while the cleaning woman Aliza Mizrahi (Edna Fliedel) conducts an investigation of her own and finds the culprit. Most of the film is set in Shalom Meir Tower in Tel Aviv, which was once the tallest building in the Middle East.

The film is based on a popular stage play, also created by Menahem Golan and starring Edna Fliedel. It is a whodunnit murder mystery, a parody on the books of Agatha Christie.

See also
 Cinema of Israel

References

Further reading 
Ido Rosen. "Tel Aviv Storeys: Skyscrapers and Heroines in Metropolitan Tel Aviv." Fireflies: Journal of Film and Television 1 (2018): 96–110.

External links
 Aliza Mizrahi in IMDb

1967 films
Films directed by Menahem Golan
Israeli comedy films
Films produced by Menahem Golan
Films about theft